A list of films produced in Argentina in 1942:

External links and references
 Argentine films of 1942 at the Internet Movie Database

1942
Films
Argentine